The Sikorsky S-19 was a Russian twin engine experimental prototype biplane aircraft built late in 1916 by the Russian Baltic Railroad Car Works while Igor Sikorsky was chief engineer of the aircraft manufacturing division.

Design and development

The S-19 was a two bay biplane powered by two  Sunbeam Crusader water-cooled V-8 engines installed in a push-pull configuration. Arranged as a twin-boom aircraft, it had a large rudder located in the center of the empenage. Two crew members occupied cockpits in the forward-most section of the booms in front of the lower wing and served as pilot and machine gunner.

Flight testing revealed sluggish performance and the aircraft was scrapped after a minor crash.

See also

Gotha WD.3

References

Military aircraft of World War I
Russian inventions
Biplanes
S-19
Aircraft first flown in 1916
1910s Russian military aircraft